Zbójno may refer to the following villages in Poland:
 Zbójno, Kuyavian-Pomeranian Voivodeship (north-central Poland)
 Zbójno, Lublin Voivodeship (east Poland)
 Zbójno, Masovian Voivodeship (east-central Poland)
 Zbójno, Świętokrzyskie Voivodeship (south-central Poland)
 Zbójno, Greater Poland Voivodeship (west-central Poland)

See also: Zbójno-Sępskie Niwy